Maria Teresa Aquino-Oreta (born Maria Teresa Aquino Aquino; June 28, 1944 – May 14, 2020), better known as Tessie Aquino-Oreta, was a Filipina politician. She was the chairperson of the Senate Committee on Education, Arts and Culture in the 11th Congress.

Early life and education 
She was born on June 28, 1944 to Benigno Aquino, Sr. and Aurora Aquino-Aquino. She was the youngest of the Aquino children of Tarlac. Her siblings included Ninoy Aquino, who was assassinated in 1983.

Aquino-Oreta attended primary school at the College of the Holy Spirit in Mendiola and high school at Assumption Convent. She graduated with a degree in Literature and History from Assumption Convent (now Assumption College); she received her International Studies degree in Ciudad Ducal, Avila, Spain. She completed her master's degree at the National Security Administration from the National Defense College of the Philippines, earning the rank of Lieutenant Colonel (Reserve) in the Philippine Air Force.

Congressional career

House of Representatives 
Before being elected to the Senate in 1998, she represented the district of Malabon-Navotas in the House of Representatives for three consecutive terms, from 1987 to 1998.

In the Lower House, she authored, and co-authored about 280 bills (79 were enacted into laws) and proposed 101 local and national resolutions (20 were adopted). She became the Assistant Majority Floor Leader during the 8th Congress in 1987 and during the 10th Congress in 1995, becoming the first woman Assistant Majority Floor Leader in the history of the Lower House.

Senate 
In the 1998 national elections, she was elected senator under the opposition Laban ng Makabayang Masang Pilipino (LAMMP) banner. In the three years she was in office, Senator Aquino-Oreta filed 197 Senate Bills (authored and co-authored) and resolutions.

Estrada impeachment trial 

She participated in the impeachment trial of former president Joseph Estrada and was one of the senators who voted against the opening of the so-called "second envelope". After the vote, she was caught on camera doing a jig, which earned her the nickname "dancing queen" and offended some people. She apologized for the incident in a widely-broadcast political advertisement.  She subsequently ran for the Senate and was defeated. She has not been elected to public office since.

Comeback attempts
Oreta ran for Senator in 2007 under the administration TEAM Unity coalition, but lost, placing 23rd. Oreta ran as Congresswoman in Malabon in the 2016 elections, but lost to former representative Federico "Ricky" Sandoval II.

Personal life
She was married to businessman Antolin M. Oreta, Jr. They had four children: Rissa, Antolin (LenLen) III, Karmela and adopted son Lorenzo (Enzo). Her sons LenLen and Enzo became mayor and councilor of Malabon, respectively.

Death
Senator Aquino-Oreta died on May 14, 2020, at the age of 75 from cancer at 10:48pm.

Ancestry

References

External links
 Personal Biography
 Tessie sa Senado Website

1944 births
2020 deaths
Teresa Aquino-Oreta
Filipino female military personnel
Kapampangan people
Philippine Air Force personnel
Senators of the 12th Congress of the Philippines
Senators of the 11th Congress of the Philippines
Members of the House of Representatives of the Philippines from Metro Manila
Liberal Party (Philippines) politicians
Nationalist People's Coalition politicians
Laban ng Demokratikong Pilipino politicians
Filipino Roman Catholics
People from Malabon
People from Tarlac
Assumption College San Lorenzo alumni
Women members of the Senate of the Philippines
Women members of the House of Representatives of the Philippines
20th-century Filipino women politicians
20th-century Filipino politicians
21st-century Filipino women politicians
21st-century Filipino politicians